James Philip Gabriel (born 1953) is an American translator and Japanologist. He is a full professor and former department chair of the University of Arizona's Department of East Asian Studies and is one of the major translators into English of the works of the Japanese novelist Haruki Murakami.

Gabriel was born in 1953 at Fort Ord, California. Gabriel earned an undergraduate degree in Chinese and a Master's in Japanese. He taught in Japan for seven years in the late 1970s and 1980s. He later completed a doctorate in Japanese at Cornell University.

Gabriel is also the translator of works by Nobel Prize-winner Kenzaburō Ōe, such as Somersault, and Senji Kuroi, such as Life in the Cul-De-Sac. Dr. Gabriel is also the author of Mad Wives and Island Dreams: Shimao Toshio and the Margins of Japanese Literature. He is currently a professor of modern Japanese literature and Department head of East Asian Studies at the University of Arizona in Tucson, Arizona, and his translations have appeared in The New Yorker, Harper's, and other publications. Dr. Gabriel is the recipient of the 2001 Sasakawa Prize for Japanese Literature, the 2001 Japan-U.S. Friendship Commission Prize for the Translation of Japanese Literature, and the 2006 PEN/Book-of-the-Month Club Translation Prize for Kafka on the Shore.

Bibliography

Translations
 1Q84, Book Three: "October–December", Haruki Murakami
 Colorless Tsukuru Tazaki and His Years of Pilgrimage,  Haruki Murakami
 Kafka On The Shore, Haruki Murakami
 Killing Commendatore, Haruki Murakami
 What I Talk About When I Talk About Running, Haruki Murakami
 The Travelling Cat Chronicles, Hiro Arikawa
 South of the Border, West of the Sun, Haruki Murakami
 Sputnik Sweetheart, Haruki Murakami
 First Person Singular, Haruki Murakami
 Life in the Cul-de-Sac, Kuroi Senji
Lonely Castle in the Mirror, Mizuki Tsujimura
Real World, Natsuo Kirino

See also
Alfred Birnbaum
Jay Rubin

References

External links
Arizona.edu

1953 births
Living people
American Japanologists
Japanese literature academics
Japanese–English translators
University of Arizona faculty
People from Fort Ord, California
Cornell University alumni